Gudlavalleru is a village and Mandal in Krishna district of the Indian state of Andhra Pradesh. It is located on the Gudivada – Machilipatnam route.

Geography
It has an average elevation of 1 metres (6 ft).

Demographics 
 census, Gudlavalleru had a population of 10,491. The total population constitute, 5,062 males and 5,429 females —a sex ratio of 1073 females per 1000 males. 986 children are in the age group of 0–6 years, of which 758 are boys and 742 are girls. The average literacy rate stands at 79.55% with 7,561 literates, significantly higher than the district average of 73.70%.

See also 
Villages in Gudlavalleru mandal

References 

Villages in Krishna district
Mandal headquarters in Krishna district